Gillian Foster  Thomson (born 28 August 1976) is an Australian soccer player who played for Canberra Eclipse in the Women's National Soccer League (WNSL) and Central Coast Mariners in the W-League. She is currently a midfielder.

Club career
Gillian made her W-League debut against Melbourne Victory on Saturday, 25 October 2008.

International career
Foster played 39 times for Australia between 2002 and 2005. She was member of Australian team at the 2003 FIFA Women's World Cup and the winning Australian team at the 2003 OFC Women's Championship.

Personal life
Foster is a qualified electrician.

References

External links
 Central Coast Mariners FC profile

1976 births
Living people
Australian women's soccer players
Central Coast Mariners FC (A-League Women) players
A-League Women players
Olympic soccer players of Australia
Footballers at the 2004 Summer Olympics
2003 FIFA Women's World Cup players
Australia women's international soccer players
Women's association football midfielders